Caprine gammaherpesvirus 2 (CpHV-2) is a species of virus in the genus Macavirus, subfamily Gammaherpesvirinae, family Herpesviridae, and order Herpesvirales.

References 

Gammaherpesvirinae